Yogi Bear is a 2010 American 3D live-action/computer-animated comedy film directed by Eric Brevig and written by Brad Copeland, Joshua Sternin and Jennifer Ventimilia. Based on the Hanna-Barbera animated television series The Yogi Bear Show, the film stars Anna Faris, Tom Cavanagh, T.J. Miller, Nate Corddry and Andrew Daly, alongside the voices of Dan Aykroyd and Justin Timberlake. The film centers on Ranger Smith as he teams up with his girlfriend Rachel Johnson, Yogi Bear, and Boo-Boo Bear to stop their home, Jellystone Park, from being logged. Production on the film took place in New Zealand in October 2008.

Produced by Donald De Line's De Line Pictures and Karen Rosenfelt's Sunswept Entertainment, Yogi Bear premiered at Westwood on December 11, 2010 and was theatrically released in the United States six days later on December 17 by Warner Bros. Pictures. Upon release, the film was met with largely negative reviews from critics and audiences for its screenplay, humor and lack of originality, though they praised the visual effects, vocal performances and faithfulness to the source material. Despite its negative reception, the film was a box office success, having grossed $203.5 million worldwide against an $80 million budget.

Plot 

Mayor R. Brown realizes that Franklin City is facing bankruptcy due to profligate spending on his part. Brown plots with his Chief of Staff to raise money for the town budget and his upcoming gubernatorial campaign by shutting down Jellystone Park and opening the land to logging. To save the park, park rangers Smith and Jones, with help from documentary filmmaker Rachel Johnson, hold a centennial festival and fireworks show in an attempt to sell season passes. To sabotage the effort, Brown promises Jones the position of head ranger if the funds are not raised. Two brown bears named Yogi and Boo-Boo, who steal picnic baskets from visitors in Jellystone Park while the rangers attempt to hinder them, had promised Smith to stay out of sight during the festival, but Jones convinces them otherwise. The bears try to please the crowd with a water skiing performance, but Yogi inadvertently sets his cape on fire, causing fireworks to be launched into the crowd, who flee in panic. 

After Jellystone is shut down, Smith is forced to stay in Evergreen Park, and scolds Yogi for interfering with the festival. Seeing that their home is in danger of being destroyed, Yogi and Boo-Boo travel to Evergreen Park where they and Smith figure out Brown's plan. They all return to Jellystone with Rachel, where they learn that Boo-Boo's pet turtle is a rare and endangered species known as a "frog-mouthed" turtle, meaning that, according to law, the park cannot be destroyed if the turtle is living there. The Chief of Staff learns about the turtle and sends Jones to kidnap it. On the day that Brown is planning a press conference to begin the destruction of the park, Smith, Rachel and the bears rescue the turtle and try to bring it to the media's attention. Jones, learning that he had been deceived by Mayor Brown, has a change of heart and helps the team bring the turtle to the press conference. At the press conference, Rachel reveals that she had installed a hidden camera in Boo-Boo's bow tie which had captured Brown admitting to his plan. Smith hooks up the camera to the jumbotron Brown is using for his press conference and shows the video, causing the crowd to turn against him. After Brown and his staff are arrested for their crimes, Jellystone Park is reopened and becomes a great success with Smith reappointed as head ranger, he and Rachel admit their feelings for each other, and Yogi and Boo-Boo stealing picnic baskets once again.

Cast 
 Tom Cavanagh as Ranger Smith, the head ranger of Jellystone Park. Unlike the series, he is the main protagonist of the movie.
 Anna Faris as Rachel Johnson, a nature documentary filmmaker, and Ranger Smith's love interest.
 Andy Daly as Mayor R. Brown, the main antagonist of the film. He is the Mayor of Franklin City who wants to shut Jellystone Park down so that he can make money for his city and become governor.
 Dan Aykroyd as the voice of Yogi Bear, a picnic basket-stealing and talking brown bear who lives in Jellystone Park. Unlike the series, he is the film's primary comic relief, despite being the titular character.
 Justin Timberlake as the voice of Boo-Boo, Yogi's best friend and sometimes the voice of reason.
 T.J. Miller as Ranger Jones, a park ranger who is tricked by Mayor Brown into getting Jellystone shut down, making the excuse that Jones will be the head ranger of the park.
 Nate Corddry as the Chief of Staff, Mayor Brown's assistant.
 Josh Robert Thompson as the narrator.

Production 
In October 2008, it was announced that a live-action/computer-animated Yogi Bear film was in the works. Ash Brannon was originally hired to direct the film, but was replaced by Eric Brevig (Journey to the Center of the Earth 3-D) when it was decided that the film would be produced in 3D. Principal photography took place on the Lake Whakamaru Reserve, Waikato, New Zealand as it was winter in the northern hemisphere, and to wait for summer of 2009 would put the production end time to be six months longer than if in southern hemisphere.

Like many Hanna-Barbera characters, Yogi's personality and mannerisms were based on a popular celebrity of his original cartoon's time. Art Carney's Ed Norton character on The Honeymooners was said to be Yogi's inspiration; his voice mannerisms broadly mimic Carney as Norton, and Carney in turn received influence from Borscht Belt and comedians of vaudeville.

Dan Aykroyd, the voice of Yogi Bear in the film, explained that he was trying to evoke the influences that shaped Daws Butler's original Yogi Bear voice: "It's about hitting certain notes, going back to those old Lower East Side rhythms, the Catskills, Jersey, Upstate New York. It's the Yiddish language, essentially, being spoken in English. It's the 'setup, delivery, punch' that sitcoms live on today. That's where the origin of American humor is." Aykroyd also stated that he grew up watching Yogi Bear on the long, cold and dark afternoons in his native Ottawa: "As a kid growing up in Ottawa, Ontario, Canada, where the sky turns dark in the winter at about 3:30, Yogi Bear was my fire, my hearth, when I would come home. I would immediately turn on the TV while I thawed out."

Justin Timberlake came in the film with a prepared Boo-Boo Bear voice; when he was learning to sing when he was younger, he imitated various cartoon characters. Regarding the film, Brevig stated that he didn't want parents who remembered watching Yogi Bear cartoons in their youth to feel marginalized and displaced by the film's contemporary depiction of Yogi Bear.

Rhythm and Hues Studios provided the CGI character animation for Yogi and Boo-Boo Bear and the frog-mouthed turtle in the film; the company had also worked on previous films based on Hanna-Barbera productions, such as The Flintstones (1994) and its prequel Viva Rock Vegas (2000); Scooby-Doo (2002) and its sequel Monsters Unleashed (2004).

Release 
The film was originally scheduled for release on June 25, 2010, but was pushed back to December 17, 2010 in order to avoid competition with Grown Ups. In theaters, the film was accompanied by a CGI Looney Tunes short titled Rabid Rider, starring Wile E. Coyote and the Road Runner.

On December 13, 2010, shortly before the film was released in the United States, a fanmade parody video titled "Yogi Bear Parody: "Booboo Kills Yogi" ending" was uploaded on YouTube, serving as an alternate and darker ending to the film (as well as a spoof of The Assassination of Jesse James by the Coward Robert Ford) in which Yogi finds Boo-Boo sitting on a chair carrying a double-barreled shotgun as he sees his own picture on a "Wanted" sign with a $5000 reward for whoever kills him. The video ends with fake end credits set to the song We'll Be Alright by Travie McCoy, showing Yogi turned into a rug. The parody was done by Edmund Earle, a 25-year-old Rhode Island School of Design graduate, who made the video in three months using only the trailers and promotional material as references. After the video went viral on Twitter, this led to many people being concerned about whether or not the younger viewers would click on the video in the belief that it is the film's actual ending. While Warner Bros. didn't demand Earle to take down the video, they added a disclaimer telling that the video was done with no one affiliated with the studio or the film's production.

Marketing 
The film's first trailer was released online on July 28, 2010. It was also attached with Cats & Dogs: The Revenge of Kitty Galore and Alpha and Omega. A second trailer premiered with Legend of the Guardians: The Owls of Ga'Hoole, and a third trailer premiered with Megamind, Tangled and Harry Potter and the Deathly Hallows – Part 1. One of the trailers was also attached with showings of Tron: Legacy in the United Kingdom.

Home media 
Warner Home Video released the film on Blu-ray and DVD on March 22, 2011, in four versions:
 DVD (single disc edition)
 Blu-ray (single disc edition)
 Blu-ray + DVD + Digital Copy combo pack
 Blu-ray 3D + Blu-ray + DVD + Digital Copy combo pack

Reception

Box office 
Yogi Bear debuted at the American box office at #2 behind Tron: Legacy, with an under-performing $16.4 million compared to Tron Legacys $44 million. The opening weekend was lower than Warner Bros. expected, but executives believed that the film would hold well throughout the holiday season. The film grossed $103.3 million in the United States and a worldwide total of $203.5 million against an $80 million budget.

Critical response 
On Rotten Tomatoes, the film has an approval rating of 13% based on 105 reviews and an average rating of 3.7/10. The site's critical consensus reads, "Yogi Bears 3D effects and all-star voice cast are cold comfort for its aggressively mediocre screenplay." On Metacritic the film has a score of 35 out of 100 based on 23 critics, indicating "generally unfavorable reviews". Audiences polled by CinemaScore gave the film an average grade of "B" on an A+ to F scale.

Common Sense Media gave the film one star, saying "Dumber-than-average family comedy won't even impress kids." IGN gave the film 4.0/10, and summed up their review by saying "Of course, Yogi Bear is meant as a kids movie. And one supposes that it works on that level (the little ones at the press screening I attended seemed mildly amused). But we learned long ago that kids movies can operate on more than one level, and that's not something that director Eric Brevig (Journey to the Center of the Earth 3-D) or his screenwriters are interested in. The result is a movie that's dumber than the average bear. Though at least it has a pee joke in it."

Spill.com appreciated the film for staying true to its original source material and not trying to "hip it up", comparing it to Alvin and the Chipmunks (2007), another live-action/CGI hybrid film that was also poorly received.

Awards

Video game 
A video game titled Yogi Bear: The Video Game was released for the Wii and Nintendo DS.

Possible sequel
In 2012, it was reported that a sequel was in the works, with Jay Chandrasekhar chosen to direct., but no further updates have ever been given.

References

External links 

 
 
 

2010 films
2010 3D films
2010 comedy films
2010s buddy comedy films
2010s children's comedy films
2010s American animated films
2010s children's animated films
American 3D films
American computer-animated films
American buddy comedy films
American children's animated comedy films
American films with live action and animation
Animated buddy films
Animated films about bears
Films about animal rights
Films directed by Eric Brevig
Films produced by Donald De Line
Films produced by Karen Rosenfelt
Films with screenplays by Brad Copeland
Films scored by John Debney
Films set in parks
Films set in forests
Films shot in New Zealand
Films based on television series
Live-action films based on animated series
Environmental films
Yogi Bear films
Warner Bros. films
2010s English-language films